Morlaye Camara (1933 – 13 August 2018) was a Guinean footballer. He competed in the men's tournament at the 1968 Summer Olympics.

References

External links
 
 

1933 births
2018 deaths
Guinean footballers
Guinea international footballers
Olympic footballers of Guinea
Footballers at the 1968 Summer Olympics
People from Kindia
Association football goalkeepers